Bluefield University  is a private Baptist university in Bluefield, Virginia. It offers 22 majors and is accredited by the Southern Association of Colleges and Schools. It is affiliated with the Baptist General Association of Virginia. Bluefield University merged with Edward Via College of Osteopathic Medicine medical school system located at the campus of Virginia Tech in Blacksburg, Virginia.

History
Bluefield University was founded as Bluefield College in 1922 by the Baptist General Association of Virginia (BGAV), after residents of Bluefield offered to donate land and start-up funds.  R.A. Landsdell became the first president in 1920, and the current administration building is named Landsdell Hall in his honor.  At its founding, Bluefield was a two-year junior college.  Future Nobel Prize winner John F. Nash took mathematics courses at the relatively new college while in high school. In his autobiography for the Nobel Foundation, he writes

Under Charles L. Harman, president from 1946 to 1971, the college built Easley Library, the dormitory Rish Hall, Harman Chapel, and a geodesic dome as the gymnasium.

In 1975, Bluefield reinvented itself as a four-year college, and during the 1989–1996 presidency of Roy A. Dobyns, student enrollment doubled to more than 800 students.  In 1998, under the leadership of President Daniel G. MacMillan, the college cut tuition by over 20% and refocused its student recruitment on the local area.

In 2007, the current president, David W. Olive, was inaugurated.  Shortly thereafter, the college raised tuition by about 20%, and announced a new strategic plan.

During the centennial anniversary of Bluefield College, it achieved university status and became Bluefield University upon announcement from President David Olive at the President's Convocation on August 18, 2021.

Presidents 
Presidents of Bluefield University have included:

 – Interim presidents

Campus
Bluefield University's campus is located on 82 acres on the eastern edge of Bluefield, Virginia, facing the northern side of the East River Mountain.

Academic and administrative buildings
 Lansdell Hall – Opening in 1922, building holds the college's primary administrative offices and classrooms. 
 Easley Library – The three-story building features the campus library on the upper two floors, while the first floor houses the education department and classrooms. 
 Harman Chapel – The spire of the chapel is featured in the college's logo. The building houses the music and theater departments and serves as a host for events including convocations, graduations, concerts, plays, and services. 
 Science Center – The building holds offices, classrooms, science labs, and technology labs. 
 Cox Visual Arts Center – Located on the southwestern corner of campus, the building holds classrooms, offices, and workspace for the art department.
 Alumni Advancement Building

Residential buildings 
 Cruise Hall – Constructed with the opening of the college in 1922, the building now serves as a male dormitory. 
 Rish Hall – The first floor contains classrooms and houses the English department, communication department, and the Academic Center for Excellence (ACE). The upper three floors serve as a male dormitory. 
 East River Hall – Female dormitory
 Alumni Hall – Male dormitory
 Bluestone Commons – Constructed in 2014, the buildings hold male and female apartment-style student housing.

Student life facilities 

 Shott Hall – Holds the Student Activities Center, main dining hall, Quick Shott Cafe, campus bookstore, and student mailboxes.
 Dan MacMillan Center – Opening in 2007, the building is the focal point for the college's outreach and service projects.

The campus also features access to outdoor activities, including an on-campus nature trail.

Athletic facilities 

 Dome Gymnasium – The dome serves as the home court for Bluefield's basketball and volleyball teams, and holds athletic offices and classrooms.
 Mitchell Stadium – The 10,000-seat football stadium has hosted home games for the Bluefield football program since 2011.
 Bowen Field – The home field for the college's baseball team seats 3,000 and sits just to the north of campus.
 East River Soccer Complex – The home field for Bluefield's soccer teams is located between Route 460 and I-77 on John Nash Blvd.
 Bluefield City Courts – Home courts for the Bluefield men's and women's tennis teams.
 Bluefield Area Softball Field – Located three miles from campus, the park holds the home field for the college's softball team.
 Fincastle on the Mountain – The 18-hole course is the home to the college's golf program.
 Herb Sims Wellness Center - A short distance from campus, this facility is used for football training and contains the football coaches' offices.

Organization
Bluefield University is organized into the following colleges and departments:

College of Arts and Letters
Department of Christian Studies
Department of Art and Design
Department of Music
Department of Theatre
Department of History
Department of English
College of Professional Programs
Department of Business
Department of Communication
Department of Graphic Communication
Department of Criminal Justice
Department of Human Services
Department of Management & Leadership
College of Sciences
Department of Biology
Department of Chemistry
Department of Exercise & Sport Science
Department of Mathematics
Department of Psychology
School of Education
School of Nursing

Athletics

The Bluefield athletic teams are called the Rams. The university is a member of the National Association of Intercollegiate Athletics (NAIA), primarily competing in the Appalachian Athletic Conference (AAC) for most of their sports since the 2014–15 academic year (which they were a member on a previous stint from 2001–02 to 2011–12); while its football team competes in the Mid-South Conference (MSC) since the 2014 fall season. They were also a member of the National Christian College Athletic Association (NCCAA), primarily competing as an independent in the Mid-East Region of the Division I level until after the 2019–20 school year to fully align with the NAIA. The Rams previously competed in the Mid-South as a full member from 2012–13 to 2013–14. Athletes make up about 60% of the student population at Bluefield. It serves as host for the NCAA Softball National Championship.

Bluefield competes in 18 intercollegiate varsity sports: Men's sports include baseball, basketball, cross country, football, golf, soccer, tennis, track & field, volleyball and wrestling. Women's sports include basketball, cross country, soccer, softball, tennis, track & field and volleyball; and co-ed sports compete in cheerleading. Former sports included women's golf. The school has won national championships in men's soccer and baseball.

Basketball 
The Bluefield Rams men's basketball team was often nationally ranked between 2007 and 2009 under head coach Jason Gillespie. In the 2008–09 season, the Rams won 27 games, including an 18–0 mark in AAC conference play and a regular season championship, but fell in the conference tournament to then-rival King University by one point, finishing the season ranked seventh in NAIA Division II. Guard/forward Omar Reed went on to play professionally with the San Antonio Spurs' NBA Development League affiliate, with the Boston Celtics organization, as well as internationally in Europe and Japan.

Baseball 
The Bluefield Rams baseball team won its first NCCAA Division I national championship in 2009 and followed with a school-record 41 wins in 2010 before losing in the NCCAA World Series finals to North Greenville. In 2007 they were the NCCAA Mid-East Regional Champs, and made their fourth NCCAA World Series appearance in 2014. Current head coach Mike White has won over 200 games with Bluefield and has sent multiple players to professional baseball. The Rams play their home games at Bowen Field. , nine former Bluefield baseball players have gone on to play professionally.

Football 
Bluefield fielded a football program from 1922 to 1941, but had not had a football program since the attack on Pearl Harbor. On June 4, 2011, Bluefield University announced the return of a football program under head coach Mike Gravier, beginning with "club football" season in 2011, and began play in the NAIA in 2012. The school hired Ordell Walker as the program's new head coach in 2013, and the Rams earned their first win since the program's return with a 46–24 defeat of the Apprentice Builders in Newport News, Va., on September 13, 2014. The Rams play their home games in 10,000-seat Mitchell Stadium.

Cross country 
Bluefield hired Coach Travis Yoder in 2014 to build a cross country and track and field program from ground zero. In his first year as head coach he had the schools first NCCAA national qualifier in school history (Kendall Haynes). After his first year Coach Travis Yoder left Bluefield. Bluefield then hired Coach Kendall Haynes to Coach cross country and is now building a track and field program as well. During Coach Haynes's first year in 2017 he had the schools first girls NCCAA national qualifiers in school history (Kenize Marshall and Jordyn O'Saben).

Notable alumni
 Jon Link – Major League Baseball player
 Kenneth Massey – sports statistician known for his development of the Massey Ratings, which stemmed from an honors project at Bluefield, and was used in the Bowl Championship Series computer rankings from 1999 to 2013

References

External links
 
 Official athletics website

 
Universities and colleges affiliated with the Southern Baptist Convention
Private universities and colleges in Virginia
Educational institutions established in 1922
Universities and colleges accredited by the Southern Association of Colleges and Schools
Education in Tazewell County, Virginia
Baptist Christianity in Virginia
Buildings and structures in Tazewell County, Virginia
Council for Christian Colleges and Universities
1922 establishments in Virginia
Appalachian Athletic Conference schools